was a  Buddhist temple in northeastern Kyoto, Japan, endowed by Emperor Shirakawa in fulfillment of a sacred vow.  The temple complex was located east of the Kamo River in the Shirakawa district; and its chief architectural feature was a nine-storied octagonal pagoda.

They are sometimes identified as the "Superlative Temples" or the "Shō Temples" because of the middle syllable of the temple name.

History
Hosshō-ji was founded in the early Heian period.  It was built on the site of one of Emperor Shirakawa's former palaces.

This temple and the other Rokushō-ji establishments had a particular function within the "cloister government" (insei) system. Although the monasteries were ostensibly established in fulfillment of vows made by these members of the Imperial family, the relationship of Emperors Shirakawa, Toba, Sutoku, and Konoe with Hosshō-ji and the other "imperial vow" temples and with the imperial residences that adjoined the temple complexes is quite revealing. Clearly the temples were not built simply as acts of piety but as ways of protecting estate income and a certain style of life. Evidently the building of new temples could serve as a coercive device to extract support from other kuge families and to justify the use of public taxes for the benefit of members of the imperial-house, the religious intent giving support to the political interest.

The Rokushō-ji were also called the six "Superiority Temples;" and each were uniquely dedicated to an aspect of esoteric Buddhist ontology, as in    
 the "Superiority of Buddhist Law" –
 Hosshō-ji,  founded by Emperor Shirakawa in 1077.
 the "Superiority of Worship" –
 , founded by Emperor Horikawa (Shirakawa's son) in 1102.
 the "Most Superior" –
 Saishō-ji, founded by Emperor Toba (Shirakawa's grandson) in 1118.
 the "Superiority of Perfection" –
 , founded by Imperial consort Taiken-mon'in (Shirakawa's adopted daughter and Emperor Toba's chief consort and the mother of Emperor Sutoku) in 1128.
 the "Superiority of Becoming" –
 , founded by Emperor Sutoku (Shirakawa's great-grandson) in 1139.
 the "Superiority of Duration" –
 , founded by Emperor Konoe (Shirakawa's great-grandson) in 1149.

An earthquake in 1185 destroyed most of the structures, and they were not reconstructed. Surviving structures at Hosshō-ji were lost to a fire in 1342. Currently the site is occupied by Kyoto City Zoo and the Shirakawain ryōkan.

See also
 List of Buddhist temples in Kyoto
 For an explanation of terms concerning Japanese Buddhism, Japanese Buddhist art, and Japanese Buddhist temple architecture, see the Glossary of Japanese Buddhism.

Notes

References
 Hall, John Whitney and Jeffrey P. Mass, eds. (1974).  Medieval Japan: Essays in Institutional History. New Haven: Yale University Press;  OCLC 50635949. [reprinted by Stanford University Press, Stanford, 1988. ;  OCLC 18576991
  Iwao, Seiichi, Teizō Iyanaga, Susumu Ishii, Shōichirō Yoshida, et al. (2002).  Dictionnaire historique du Japon. Paris: Maisonneuve & Larose. ;  OCLC 51096469
 Ponsonby-Fane, Richard Arthur Brabazon. (1956).  Kyoto: The Old Capital of Japan, 794–1869. Kyoto: The Ponsonby Memorial Society.  OCLC 36644
 Takagaki, Cary Shinji. (1999).  "The Rokusho-ji, the six superiority temples of Heian Japan." (University of Toronto PhD thesis, http://hdl.handle.net/1807/13266). Ottawa: National Library of Canada/Bibliothèque nationale du Canada.	
 Varley, H. Paul, ed. (1980). [ Kitabatake Chikafusa, 1359], Jinnō Shōtōki ("A Chronicle of Gods and Sovereigns: Jinnō Shōtōki of Kitabatake Chikafusa" translated by H. Paul Varley). New York: Columbia University Press.  
	

Religious organizations established in the 11th century
Buddhist temples in Kyoto
Buddhist archaeological sites in Japan
Buddhism in the Heian period
Former Buddhist temples